Thynnichthys sandkhol, the Sandkhol carp, is a species of cyprinid of the genus Thynnichthys. It inhabits the Krishna River and Godavari River in India. Described in 1839 by William Henry Sykes (as Leuciscus sandkhol), it is classified as "endangered" on the IUCN Red List, and its population is declining.

References

Cyprinid fish of Asia
Freshwater fish of India
Taxa named by William Henry Sykes
Fish described in 1839
IUCN Red List endangered species